Recta is a district of Bongará Province in Peru.

References

External links
Recta district official website 

Districts of the Bongará Province
Districts of the Amazonas Region